James L. Reese III (born December 5, 1968) is a former American football coach.  He was the 19th head football coach for at Tennessee State University in Nashville, Tennessee, serving for five seasons, from 2000 to 2004, and compiling a record of 24–33 (.421).

Head coaching record

References

1968 births
Living people
American football fullbacks
Tennessee State Tigers football coaches
Tennessee State Tigers football players
Players of American football from Nashville, Tennessee